La Cuesta District may refer to:

 La Cuesta District, Otuzco, in Otuzco province, La Libertad region, Peru
 La Cuesta District, Corredores, in Corredores Canton, Puntarenas province, Costa Rica